Longhua Subdistrict (龙华街道) could refer to:

 Longhua Subdistrict, Shenzhen, in Bao'an District, Shenzhen, Guangdong
 Longhua Subdistrict, Qiqihar, in Tiefeng District, Qiqihar, Heilongjiang
 Longhua Subdistrict, Jilin City, in Longtan District, Jilin, Jilin
 Longhua Subdistrict, Shanghai, in Xuhui District, Shanghai